(NJPW), is a Japanese professional wrestling promotion based in Nakano, Tokyo. NJPW personnel consists of professional wrestlers, commentators, color commentators, ring announcers, referees, trainers, producers, bookers, and various other positions. Executives and board members are also listed.

Background 
NJPW contracts typically range from developmental deals for dojo trainees to full-time contracts. Personnel appear on untelevised live events and on televised events which are aired on various broadcasters or on NJPW's own international streaming service, New Japan World.

Personnel is organized by role in the NJPW. The performer's ring name is listed on the left and their real name is on the right. This list also acknowledges which stable (referred to by NJPW as "units") a wrestler is a part of – this is listed as it is considered by the company to be a vital part of NJPW. "(L)" indicates the leader of the group.

As of 2023, there are twelve central units in NJPW:

NJPW
Main Unit
Chaos
Guerrillas of Destiny
Los Ingobernables de Japón
United Empire
Bullet Club
House of Torture
Just5Guys
 Strong Style

NJPW Strong
 Team Filthy
 TMDK
 Stray Dog Army

NJPW also produces a weekly show in US, NJPW Strong. As NJPW has working relationships with All Elite Wrestling (AEW), Consejo Mundial de Lucha Libre (CMLL), Game Changer Wrestling (GCW), Impact Wrestling, Major League Wrestling (MLW), Revolution Pro Wrestling (RPW), Ring of Honor (ROH), and the United Wrestling Network (UWN), wrestlers may have these promotions listed as their affiliated unit. G・B・H is regarded by NJPW as a unit although they are now simply a tag team; NJPW additionally lists Seigigun as Yuji Nagata’s unit even though he is the group's sole member.

Roster

Male wrestlers

Heavyweight division

Junior heavyweight division

NJPW Strong

NJPW Tamashii

Young Lions

Female wrestlers

Stardom division

Referees

Broadcast team

Other

Medical team

Other personnel

NJPW Music Group

Corporate

See also
List of current champions in New Japan Pro-Wrestling
List of former New Japan Pro-Wrestling personnel

References

External links
 NJPW roster at NJPW.co.jp (Japanese website)
 NJPW roster at NJPW1972.com (English website)

Lists of professional wrestling personnel
Personnel